Alveolo-palatal affricate may refer to the following two consonants:

Voiced alveolo-palatal affricate
Voiceless alveolo-palatal affricate

Affricates